Satyamev Jayate or Satyameva Jayate is the national motto of India.

Satyamev Jayate may also refer to:

Film
 Satyamev Jayate (film), a 1987 Bollywood film starring Vinod Khanna and Meenakshi Sheshadri
 Sathyameva Jayathe, a 2000 Malayalam movie directed by Viji Thampi and starring Suresh Gopi and Aiswarya
 Satyameva Jayate (2009 film), a 2009 Telugu film starring Rajasekhar and Sanjana Galrani
 Satyameva Jayate (2018 film), a 2018 Bollywood film starring John Abraham and Manoj Bajpayee

Television
 Satyamev Jayate (talk show), on Star Plus hosted by Aamir Khan
 Satyamev Jayate (season 1)
 Satyamev Jayate (season 2)
 Satyamev Jayate (season 3)

Other
 "Satyameva Jayathe" (song), a 2011 song by SuperHeavy